The Roman Catholic Diocese of Mahagi–Nioka is a diocese located in the territories of Mahagi–Nioka, Ituri Province, in the Ecclesiastical province of Kisangani in the Democratic Republic of the Congo.

History
 July 2, 1962: Established as Diocese of Mahagi from the Diocese of Bunia
 October 30, 1967: Renamed as Diocese of Mahagi – Nioka

Bishops

Ordinaries, in reverse chronological order
 Bishops of Mahagi–Nioka (Latin Rite), below
 Bishop Sosthène Ayikuli Udjuwa (2010.11.16 - present)
 Bishop Marcel Utembi Tapa (2001.10.16 – 2008.11.28), appointed Archbishop of Kisangani
 Bishop Alphonse-Marie Runiga Musanganya (1980.09.04 – 2001.10.16)
 Bishop Thomas Kuba Thowa (1967.10.30 – 1979.10.10); see below
 Bishop of Mahagi (Latin Rite), below
 Bishop Thomas Kuba Thowa (1962.07.02 – 1967.10.30); see above

Other priest of this diocese who became bishop
Etienne Ung’eyowun Bediwegi, appointed Bishop of Bondo in 2008

See also
Roman Catholicism in the Democratic Republic of the Congo

Sources
 GCatholic.org
 Catholic Hierarchy

Roman Catholic dioceses in the Democratic Republic of the Congo
Christian organizations established in 1962
Roman Catholic dioceses and prelatures established in the 20th century
1962 establishments in the Republic of the Congo (Léopoldville)
Roman Catholic Ecclesiastical Province of Kisangani